This article contains an overview of the year 1980 in athletics. The major athletics event of the year was the 1980 Moscow Olympics. A boycott of this competition meant many of world's leading athletes did not face each other, with many of the boycotting athletes taking part in the rival Liberty Bell Classic competition.

A further global event, the 1980 World Championships in Athletics, was held specifically for women athletes in the 400 metres hurdles and 3000 metres disciplines, as neither event featured on the Olympic programme in spite of IAAF approval.

Major events

World

Olympic Games
Paralympic Games
World Cross Country Championships
World Championships in Athletics
Liberty Bell Classic (Olympic Boycott Games)
Gymnasiade

Regional

CARIFTA Games
CAC Junior Championships
Pan American Junior Championships
South American Junior Championships
European Indoor Championships
European Champion Clubs Cup Cross Country
European Champion Clubs Cup
Islamic Games
Balkan Games

World records

Men

Women

Season's bests

Marathon winners

Awards

Births
January 1 – Masumi Aya, Japanese hammer thrower
January 2 – Yusuke Yachi, Japanese race walker
January 7 – Lívia Tóth, Hungarian distance runner
January 8 – Mitsuhiro Sato, Japanese sprinter
January 11 – Li Xiaoxue, Chinese hammer thrower
January 19 – Matic Osovnikar, Slovenian sprinter
January 21 – Elva Goulbourne, Jamaican long jumper
January 25 – Christian Olsson, Swedish athlete
January 27 – Naleya Downer, Jamaican sprinter
January 31 – Joel Brown, American  hurdler
January 31 – Adriana Pirtea, Romanian long-distance runner
February 3 – Markus Esser, German hammer thrower
February 3 – Sini Pöyry, Finnish hammer thrower
February 4 – Yared Asmerom, Eritrean long-distance runner
February 4 – Gary Kikaya, Congolese sprinter
February 7 – Emma Ania, British sprinter
February 11 – Karin Ruckstuhl, Dutch heptathlete
February 13 – Tetyana Holovchenko, Ukrainian distance runner
February 13 – Irina Naumenko, Kazakhstani heptathlete
February 20 – Bram Som, Dutch track and field athlete
February 21 – Takayuki Matsumiya, Japanese long-distance runner
February 24 – Aki Heikkinen, Finnish decathlete
February 25 – Marisa Barros, Portuguese long-distance runner
February 26 – Irina Butor, Belarusian heptathlete
March 3 – Nikolett Szabó, Hungarian javelin thrower
March 7 – Olli-Pekka Karjalainen, Finnish hammer thrower
March 12 – California Molefe, Botswanan athlete
March 15 – Kim Il-Nam, North Korean long-distance runner
March 19 – Justus Koech, Kenyan middle-distance runner
March 23 – Teja Melink, Slovenian pole vaulter
March 30 – Amélie Perrin, Franch hammer thrower
April 6 – Tommi Evilä, Finnish long jumper
April 13 – Boštjan Buč, Slovenian track and field athlete
April 17 – Igors Kazakevičs, Latvian race walker
April 18 – Wojciech Kondratowicz, Polish hammer thrower
April 19 – Gudisa Shentema, Ethiopian long-distance runner
May 1 – Inês Henriques, Portuguese race walker
May 2 – Chris Boyles, American decathlete
May 2 – Ronetta Smith, Jamaican sprinter
May 10 – Mayumi Kawasaki, Japanese race walker
May 14 – Eugène Martineau, Dutch decathlete
May 17 – Tatyana Sibileva, Russian race walker
May 20 – Chinatsu Mori, Japanese shot putter (d. 2006)
May 23 – Ri Kum-Song, North Korean long-distance runner
June 2 – Shingo Suetsugu, Japanese track and field athlete
June 8 – Vânia Silva, Portuguese hammer thrower
June 13 – Alistair Cragg, Irish distance runner
June 17 – Shitaye Gemechu, Ethiopian long-distance runner
June 19 – Sanjay Ayre, Jamaican athlete
July 5 – Park Ju-Young, South Korean long-distance runner
July 8 – Noraldo Palacios, Colombian javelin thrower
July 9 – Brooke Krueger, Australian hammer thrower
July 12 – Mikko Kyyrö, Finnish discus thrower
July 17 – Rashid Ramzi, Moroccan athlete
July 24 – Wilfred Bungei, Kenyan middle-distance runner
July 27 – Alena Neumiarzhitskaya, Belarusian sprinter
July 31 – Masato Naito, Japanese hurdler
August 11 – Monika Pyrek, Polish pole vaulter
August 23 – Bronwyn Eagles, Australian hammer thrower
August 23 – Roisin McGettigan, Irish distance runner
August 24 – Shani Marks, American triple jumper
August 29 – Perdita Felicien, Canadian track and field athlete
September 6 – Nailiya Yulamanova, Russian long-distance runner
September 6 – Gulnara Vygovskaya, Russian long-distance runner
September 8 – Mbulaeni Mulaudzi, South African middle-distance runner
September 16 – Lukáš Melich, Czech hammer thrower
September 25 – Jennifer Joyce, Canadian hammer thrower
September 28 – Maurice Smith, Jamaican decathlete
October 7 – Clarissa Claretti, Italian hammer thrower
October 7 – Olesya Zykina, Russian track and field athlete
October 16 – Maureen Griffin, American hammer thrower
October 26 – Deriba Merga, Ethiopian long-distance runner
November 9 – Tamicka Clarke, Bahamian sprinter
November 14 – Naoko Sakamoto, Japanese long-distance runner
November 19 – Yipsi Moreno, Cuban hammer thrower
November 24 – Zoe Derham, English hammer thrower
December 12 – Dejene Berhanu, Ethiopian runner
December 13 – Venera Getova, Bulgarian discus thrower
December 17 – Alexandra Papageorgiou, Greek hammer thrower

Deaths
February 11 – Paavo Yrjölä (77), Finnish decathlete (b. 1902)
February 21 – Mario Lanzi (63), Italian middle-distance runner (b. 1914)
March 31 – Jesse Owens (66), American sprinter (b. 1913)
May 9 – Rolf Hansen (73), Norwegian long-distance runner (b. 1906)
December 24 – Heikki Liimatainen (86), Finnish long-distance runner (b. 1894)

References
 Year Lists
 Association of Road Racing Statisticians
 1980 Year Rankings
 Year Rankings

Athletics
Athletics (track and field) by year